This is a list of Kosovo women's national football team results from 2020 to present.

Fixtures and results

2020

2021

2022

2023

Kosovo against other countries

Notes and references

Notes

References

External links
 
Kosovo (women) News about the team

Kosovo
women's national football team results (2020–present)